The Second in Command is a 1915 American silent drama film directed by William J. Bowman and starring Francis X. Bushman and Marguerite Snow. The film is based on a 1901 Broadway play of the same name by Robert Marshall.

Cast
Francis X. Bushman as Lt. Col. Miles Anstruther
Marguerite Snow as Muriel Mannering
William Clifford as- Major Christopher Bingham
Lester Cuneo as Lt. Sir Walter Mannering
Helen Dunbar as Lady Sarah Harburgh
Paul Byron as Hon. Bertie Carstairs
Marcia Moore as Nora Vining
Evelyn Greeley as Lady Harburgh's Maid

See also
Francis X. Bushman filmography

Preservation status
A print of The Second in Command was donated by MGM, the inheritors of Metro Pictures, to the George Eastman House Motion Picture Collection.

References

External links

1915 films
American silent feature films
American black-and-white films
Silent American drama films
1915 drama films
Metro Pictures films
Films directed by William Bowman
1910s American films